Incest is a popular topic in English erotic fiction; there are entire collections and websites devoted solely to incest, and there exists an entire genre of pornographic pulp fiction known as "incest novels". Incest is sometimes mentioned or described in mainstream, non-erotic fiction. Connotations can be negative, positive, or neutral.

Film and television

Literature

Music
 In the "Weird Al" Yankovic song, "A Complicated Song", a parody of the Avril Lavigne song, "Complicated", one of the verses is about the main character noticing how his fiancée has a tattoo of her family crest, and realizes it is his own family's crest, and that she is his cousin.
 English musician Kate Bush's song "The Kick Inside" from her 1978 album of the same name depicts an incestuous relationship, pregnancy and suicide involving a brother and sister.
 The German metal band Rammstein touches on incest in "Spiel mit mir", ("Play with me"), featuring an incestuous relationship between brothers. In "Spiel mit mir", the older brother apparently forces himself on his younger brother for sex so he will be able to sleep. Rammstein has written other songs dealing with incest including "Laichzeit" ("Spawn time") and "Tier" ("Animal").
 The so-called "Mamasan Trilogy" by Seattle rock group Pearl Jam tells the story of a man's incestuous relationship with his mother and the subsequent unfolding events. The trilogy begins with "Alive", which singer Eddie Vedder explains as being part autobiographical and part fiction. When Eddie was a teenager, his mother revealed to him that the man he thought was his father was actually his stepfather, and his biological father was dead. It is the first piece to a trilogy of songs: "Alive", "Once" and "Footsteps." "Alive" tells a story of incest, which leads to the murderous killing spree described in "Once", and eventually looking back from a prison cell in "Footsteps".
 The song "This Love is Fucking Right" by The Pains of Being Pure at Heart has been claimed to be about a consensual romantic relationship between a brother and sister; however, band member Kip Berman states this is incorrect and that the term "sister" is used in a generic context.
 The Prize Fighter Inferno released a song titled "Our Darling Daughter You Are, Little Cecillia Marie" on the album My Brother's Blood Machine, detailing a case of habitual father/daughter molestation, resulting in her attempted murder of her father.
 "Embryo" by the Japanese band Dir En Grey is about a mother dying and the father raping the daughter. At the end of the song, the girl kills the father and discovers she is pregnant with his child.
 The song "Lemon Incest" by Charlotte and Serge Gainsbourg is a song and music video about an incestuous relationship between a father and his daughter, which caused controversy because the singers themselves were father and daughter, and it caused suspicions that the song may be autobiographical. Stirring the pot, the single cover is a picture of the half-clothed Serge with his daughter Charlotte lying across his chest. However, the Gainsbourgs denied these allegations and the song became very popular in France.

Song lyrics
Another reference to incest is included in "The End" by psychedelic rock band The Doors, in which Jim Morrison sings, "Father/ Yes son?/ I want to kill you/ Mother, I want to... (fuck you)."

British musician Kate Bush's song "The Kick Inside" from her 1978 album of the same name depicts an incestuous relationship, pregnancy and suicide involving a brother and sister.

The German metal band Rammstein touches on incest in "Spiel mit mir", ("Play with me"), featuring an incestuous relationship between brothers. In "Spiel mit mir", the older brother apparently forces himself on his younger brother for sex so he will be able to sleep. Rammstein has written other songs dealing with incest including "Laichzeit" ("Spawn time") and "Tier" ("Animal").

The death metal band Cancer has a song on the album Death Shall Rise called "Tasteless Incest", which is a song about an old man raping his own family. It is described that he hopes his children will rape their children as well, which often happens with sexual abuse.

The so-called "Mamasan Trilogy" by Seattle rockers Pearl Jam tells the story of a man's incestuous relationship with his mother and the subsequent unfolding events. The trilogy begins with Alive, which singer Eddie Vedder explains as being part autobiographical and part fiction. When Eddie was a teenager, his mother revealed to him that the man he thought was his father was actually his stepfather, and his biological father was dead. It is the first piece to a trilogy of songs: "Alive", "Once" and "Footsteps." "Alive" tells a story of incest, which leads to the murderous killing spree described in "Once", and eventually looking back from a prison cell in "Footsteps".

The song "Fair Game" by alternative rock band The Like features the lyric "we're one big family...Who says family doesn't kiss? Oh, every gang's a bit incestuous." Singer and songwriter Elizabeth "Z" Berg talked about her "incestuous and forbidden" relationship, which talks about every family gang being incestuous.

The song "This Love is Fucking Right" by The Pains of Being Pure at Heart is about a consensual romantic relationship between a brother and sister.

South Park: Bigger, Longer & Uncut features the song "Uncle Fucka", in which accusations of incest are levelled by Terrance and Phillip. This was not the first time Trey Parker explored incest, as he recorded a song in 1985 on a self-produced cassette tape (Immature: A Collection of Love Ballads for the '80s) titled Twin Brothers In Love, which explored Twin Brothers who were in love with each other.

Parental-incest lyrics
A thirteen-year-old boy is molested by his mother because he looks like his deceased father in the song "Alive" by Pearl Jam, from the album Ten. Similarly, The Prize Fighter Inferno released a song titled "Our Darling Daughter You Are, Little Cecillia Marie" on the album My Brother's Blood Machine, detailing a case of habitual father/daughter incest/rape, resulting in her attempted murder of her father.

"Embryo" by the Japanese band Dir En Grey is about a mother dying and the father raping the daughter. At the end of the song, the girl kills the father and discovers she is pregnant with his child.

The song Lemon Incest by Charlotte and Serge Gainsbourg is a song and music video about an incestuous relationship between a father and his daughter. The single cover is a picture of the half-clothed father with his daughter lying across his chest. Considering that father/daughter was the same family tie that the singers shared it caused suspicions that the song may be autobiographical. However, the Gainsbourgs denied these allegations and the song became very popular in France.

Gaming 
In Fire Emblem: Genealogy of the Holy War, the Archbishop Manfroy attempts to revive the dark dragon lord Loptous by manipulating half-siblings Arvis and Deirdre into marrying each other. Their union would produce a human vessel capable of hosting the consciousness of Loptous. Manfroy kidnaps Deirdre from her husband and erases her memory. Arvis and Deirdre marry and eventually have twins, Julius and Julia, the former becoming the host of Loptous.

In Vampire: The Masquerade – Bloodlines, the two "sisters" Therese and Jeanette Voerman are revealed to be the same person: Therese was the original personality, and Jeanette was a sex-obsessed personality created so that Therese did not have to consciously experience being repeatedly sexually abused by her father. One day, "their" father forced himself on her when Therese was still in control, and she murdered him with a shotgun and was sent to an asylum. There, a Malkavian turned her into a vampire. The resulting supernatural psychosis caused her personality split to worsen, each side becoming a wholly fleshed out consciousness, with "Therese" being cold and repressed, and "Jeanette" getting the hyper-sexuality and Borderline Personality Disorder.

In Assassin's Creed: Brotherhood, the main villain, historical figure Cesare Borgia has an incestuous relationship with his younger sister Lucrezia, who it is suggested was also sexually manipulating her father, on the instructions of her brother.

In the videogame Catherine (2010), Archie was locked in a cellar and raped by his mother as a child. Although he eventually escaped, it left him with some serious mother issues.

In Harvester, it's revealed later that Mr. Pottsdam masturbates to his daughter by watching her through a hole in the wall.

In Danganronpa V3: Killing Harmony, Korekiyo Shinguji the Ultimate Anthropologist, had an incestuous relationship with his unnamed older sister. His sister was chronically ill and Korekiyo spent most of his time with her in the hospital. During that time, his relationship with his sister was considered true love and didn't care what society thought of him. At some point, his older sister died, and developed the idea to send friends to meet up with her in the afterlife. Korekiyo became a serial killer, with his goal being 100 victims, all-female. Korekiyo seems to communicate to his sister in Tulpa, by wearing lipstick underneath his mask.

Sculpture

The National Academy Museum presented a sculptural series by Tess O'Dwyer on the subject of incest entitled "Remnants of Violence"; the work suspended dozens of tricycle seats with bronze figures of sexually molested children and their headless abusers as a site specific work in the museum's rotunda in May 2014.

See also
 Transgressive fiction
 Incest in the Bible
 Incest in folklore
 Incest pornography

References

Incest in fiction
Sexuality in popular culture
Topics in popular culture